The 2005 season was the New Orleans Saints' 39th in the National Football League.

The season began with the team trying to improve from their 8–8 record from 2004. The Saints played two preseason games in the Louisiana Superdome before being forced to evacuate New Orleans due to Hurricane Katrina. 
They were forced to play the rest of the season on the road, splitting their games between their temporary headquarters at San Antonio’s Alamodome, and LSU’s Tiger Stadium in Baton Rouge, and even playing their first home game at Giants Stadium. 

The season ended with a 3–13 record, their equal-worst record alongside 1996 and 1999 since their 1–15 1980 season, and the firing of Jim Haslett. He was replaced by Sean Payton the following 2006 season.

This was also Aaron Brooks' last quarterback season as he was released during the offseason, thus being replaced by Drew Brees in the same season Sean Payton was hired.

Offseason

NFL Draft

Personnel

Staff

Roster

Preseason

Regular season

Schedule

Standings

See also
Effect of Hurricane Katrina on the New Orleans Saints

References

External links
2005 New Orleans Saints at Pro-Football-Reference.com

New Orleans Saints
New Orleans Saints seasons
New